The 2014 African Badminton Championships were held in Gaborone, Botswana between 27–29 April and organised by the Badminton Confederation of Africa.

Medalists

Medal table

References

External links 
 Individual Result
 Team Result

African Badminton Championships
African Badminton Championships
Badminton Championships
Badminton tournaments in Botswana
African Badminton Championships